The New Britain water rat (Hydromys neobritannicus) is a species of semiaquatic rodent in the family Muridae.
It is found only on the island of New Britain in Papua New Guinea. It is threatened by habitat loss.

References

Rats of Asia
Rodents of Papua New Guinea
Mammals described in 1935
Taxonomy articles created by Polbot
Hydromys
Taxa named by George Henry Hamilton Tate
Taxa named by Richard Archbold